Koi Krylgan Kala (Uzbek: Qoʻyqirilgan qalʼa; Russian: Кой-Крылган-Кала)  is an archaeological site located outside the village of Taza-Kel'timinar in the Ellikqal'a District (Uzbek: Ellikqalʼa tumani; Russian: Элликкалинский район) in the Republic of Karakalpakstan, an autonomous republic of Uzbekistan. In ancient times, it was sited along a canal in the Oxus delta region.

There is some relationship between Koi Krylgan Kala and Toprak-Kala, 30 km to the northwest. It is a temple complex of the Chorasmian Dynasty, an Iranian people who ruled the area of Khwarezm. It was built in the 4th-3rd century BCE.  The Apa-Saka tribe destroyed it c. 200 BCE, but later it was rebuilt into a settlement, which lasted until c. 400 CE.  It was discovered in 1938 by Sergey Pavlovitch Tolstov, leader of the Chorasmian Archaeological-Ethnological Expedition.  It contained a Mazdian fire temple and was decorated with frescos of wine consumption.

The explorer Sergey Tolstov drew a reconstruction of the ancient fortress.

Notes

References

Central Asia
Archaeology of Iran
Archaeological sites in Uzbekistan
Former populated places in Uzbekistan
Kushan Empire